The 2016 Copa do Brasil Finals were the final two-legged tie that will decided the 2016 Copa do Brasil, the 28th season of the Copa do Brasil, Brazil's national cup football tournament organised by the Brazilian Football Confederation. The finals were contested in a two-legged home-and-away format between Atlético Mineiro, from Minas Gerais, and Grêmio, from Rio Grande do Sul. The latter were crowned champions by an aggregate score of 4–2.

The first leg was played at the Mineirão stadium in Belo Horizonte, on 23 November 2016. The second leg was scheduled to be played in the Arena do Grêmio, in Porto Alegre, on 30 November 2016, but was postponed to 7 December, following the crash of an aeroplane carrying the squad of Brazilian team Chapecoense on their way to the first leg of the Copa Sudamericana final.

It was Atlético Mineiro's second and Grêmio's eighth appearance in the finals of the competition, and the first time the teams faced each other in this stage. Grêmio earned the right to play in the 2017 Copa Libertadores through their victory.

Qualified teams

Road to the final

Note: In all results below, the score of the finalist is given first (H: home; A: away).

Match
The home-and-away teams for both legs were determined by a draw held on 4 November 2016 at the Brazilian Football Confederation headquarters in Rio de Janeiro, Brazil.

See also
2016 Campeonato Brasileiro Série A

References

External links
Copa do Brasil (official website)
Copa do Brasil at Brazilian Football Confederation

2016
Finals
Copa do Brasil Finals
Copa do Brasil Finals 2016
Copa do Brasil Finals 2016
November 2016 sports events in South America
December 2016 sports events in South America